The 1981 Alitalia Open was a men's tennis tournament played on outdoor clay courts in Florence, Italy that was part of the 1981 Volvo Grand Prix circuit. It was the ninth edition of the tournament and was played from 11 May until 17 May 1981. First-seeded José Luis Clerc won the singles title.

Finals

Singles
 José Luis Clerc defeated  Raúl Ramírez 6–1, 6–2
 It was Clerc's 1st singles title of the year and the 11th of his career.

Doubles
 Pavel Složil /  Raúl Ramírez defeated  Paolo Bertolucci /  Adriano Panatta 6–3, 3–6, 6–3

References

External links
 ITF tournament edition details

Alitalia Florence Open
Alitalia Florence Open
Tennis tournaments in Italy